Katyshevo is a rural locality (a village) in Kovarditskoye Rural Settlement, Muromsky District, Vladimir Oblast, Russia. The population was 7 as of 2010. There are 2 streets.

Geography 
Katyshevo is located on the Ilevna River, 21 km west of Murom (the district's administrative centre) by road. Okulovo is the nearest rural locality.

References 

Rural localities in Muromsky District
Muromsky Uyezd